Eumaeus atala, also known as the Atala butterfly or coontie hairstreak, is a small colorful butterfly in the family Lycaenidae. It is found in southeastern Florida (including the Florida Keys) in the United States, and the Bahamas, Cuba, and the Cayman Islands in the West Indies. Its coloration and habits are unique among butterflies within its range.

History
The species was originally described by the Cuban zoologist Felipe Poey. He named the butterfly for Atala, the Native American heroine of an 1801 French novella (Atala, ou Les Amours de deux sauvages dans le desert or in English: "Atala, or the Loves of two Indian savages in the desert") of the same name by Chateaubriand.

Ecology
Throughout its range, the larvae feed on a native cycad, Zamia integrifolia (commonly called "coontie palm" or "arrowhead"), as well as the introduced Zamia pumila and other exotic ornamental cycads. In Cuba, the cycad Cycas revoluta is also eaten.

Adult butterflies take flower nectar and sometimes roost in trees. Adults fly through much of the year. The natural habitat is open brushy areas and tropical hammocks, often in pine woodlands. Many populations now exist in suburban areas with ornamental cycads. Males keep close to a site with host plants, which often forms small colonies of a few individuals. The females, however, may disperse in search of more hosts.

Description
The Atala butterfly is a great example of aposematic (warning) coloration throughout its life cycle. The brightly colored larva or caterpillar feeds on cycads that contain a toxic secondary plant chemical (cycasin) which it retains in its body for life.  Birds, lizards, and other animals may attempt to prey on the larvae, pupae, and adults, but find them distasteful and learn to avoid these brightly patterned insects.

The butterfly's flight is slow, unlike the swift, erratic flight of many other Lycaenidae.

Breeding
Like many Lepidoptera, male atalas have hair-pencils (coremata) on their abdomens used in courtship; the male hovers in front of the female, wafting pheromones exuded from the pencils in her direction. Eggs are laid in clusters of 10-50 on the leaf tips of the host plant. Larvae feed on the leaves. Pupation is usually done on the host plant.

Conservation
The Florida/United States population was at one time believed to have become extirpated due to overharvesting of its host plant, the coontie palm. It was not collected in Florida from 1937 until 1959. The Atala butterfly is now extremely common locally in southeast Florida, rebounding to the extent of almost being considered a pest, as it has begun to eat ornamental cycads planted in suburban areas. In Palm Springs, Florida, the G-Star School of the Arts has been contributing to the growth of local population numbers.

Gallery

References

Jim P. Brock, Kenn Kaufman (2003). Butterflies of North America. Boston: Houghton Mifflin. .
Jeffrey Glassberg (1999). Butterflies through Binoculars: The East A Field Guide to the Butterflies of Eastern North America. New York: Oxford University Press. .
James A. Scott (1986). The Butterflies of North America: A Natural History and Field Guide. Stanford, California: Stanford University Press. .
 Butterflies of North America
 BugGuide.net

External links

Eumaeus atala on the UF / IFAS Featured Creatures website

Eumaeini
Butterflies of the Caribbean
Butterflies of North America
Butterflies of Cuba
Fauna of the Bahamas
Taxa named by Felipe Poey
Butterflies described in 1832